The Fairey N.4 was a 1920s British five-seat long range reconnaissance flying boat. Designed and built by the Fairey Aviation Company to meet an Admiralty requirement for a very large four-engined reconnaissance aircraft, it was the world's biggest flying boat when it first flew in 1923.

Development
Following an increase in experience with flying boats in 1917 the Admiralty issued Specification N.4. The specification called for a four-engined long-range reconnaissance flying boat. The Admiralty ordered two aircraft from Fairey and one from Phoenix Dynamo Manufacturing Company. Fairey sub-contracted the building of the second to Dick, Kerr & Co. of Lytham St. Annes.

Not unusual for the era, the design was a biplane, with the engines mounted as two push-pull pairs between the upper and lower wing, each driving a four-bladed propeller.

The first N.4 (named Atalanta) was that assembled by Phoenix Dynamo with a hull designed by Charles Nicholson, built by the Gosport Aircraft Company was also transported to the Isle of Grain, but never flown and scrapped as the service lost interest in large flying boats. During April 1919 when the hull was complete, Flight reported the aircraft would be even larger than the Felixstowe Fury.

The second N.4 (also named Atalanta) completed in 1921, first flew on 4 July 1923 powered by four 650 hp (485 kW) Rolls-Royce Condor IA piston engines. The hull built in Hythe by May, Harden & May and delivered to Lytham St. Annes for assembly. The complete aircraft was then dismantled, taken by road to the Isle of Grain and stored before for its first flight.

The third N.4 Mk.II (named Titania) included improvements and later variant Condor III engines. The hull designed by Linton Hope, built on the Clyde by yacht builders Fyffes and delivered to The Fairey Aviation Company at Hamble, Southampton for assembly and transport to the Isle of Grain. Titania was not flown straight away and stored, first flying on 24 July 1925.

Specifications (Mk II Titania)

See also

References

Notes

Bibliography

External links

 An artist's impression

1920s British military reconnaissance aircraft
Flying boats
N.4
Four-engined push-pull aircraft
Biplanes
Aircraft first flown in 1923